Effingham is a city in and the county seat of Effingham County, Illinois, United States. It is in South Central Illinois. Its population was 12,252 at the 2020 census. The city is part of the Effingham, IL Micropolitan Statistical Area.

The city bills itself as "The Crossroads of Opportunity" because of its location at the intersection of two major Interstate highways: I-57 running from Chicago to Sikeston, Missouri, and I-70 running from Utah to Maryland. It is also served by U.S. Route 45, which runs from Ontonagon, Michigan to Mobile, Alabama, U.S. Route 40, the historic National Road, which stretches from Atlantic City, New Jersey to Silver Summit, Utah, and Illinois routes 32 and 33 also run through the city. It is also a major railroad junction, the crossing of the Illinois Central main line from Chicago to Memphis with the Pennsylvania Railroad line from Indianapolis to St. Louis. For this reason, Effingham has a much broader range of restaurants and lodging facilities than other typical towns of its size.

Geography 
Effingham is located at  (39.120903, −88.545909).

Effingham is served by a total of 5 highways, only 2 of them being interstates. Interstate 57 comes into Effingham County with Edgewood, Illinois. It officially comes into Effingham was a cross Directional T interchange with Interstate 70 west towards St. Louis. It runs concurrently with Interstate 57 as it goes through the city's southside exits. It makes its first with W Fayette Avenue and then takes a short curve east and makes a half diamond and half partial cloverleaf interchange with N Keller Drive and Illinois Route 33. After the interchange, it makes an interchange with U.S. Route 45 and the concurrency ends with a last Directional T interchange with Interstate 70. This time, Interstate 70 runs off east towards Indianapolis making Interstate 57 continue its route towards Mattoon, Illinois, Champaign, Illinois, and finally Chicago.

Demographics 

As of the 2000 United States Census, there were 12,384 people, 5,330 households, and 3,187 families residing in the city. The racial makeup of the city was 93.31% White, 3.8% African American, 0.19% Native American, 0.59% Asian, 0.38% from other races, and 0.69% from two or more races. Hispanic or Latino people of any race were 1.04% of the population.

There were 5,330 households, out of which 29.9% had children under the age of 18 living with them, 45.0% were married couples living together, 11.4% had a female householder with no husband present, and 40.2% were non-families. 36.1% of all households were made up of individuals, and 15.9% had someone living alone who was 65 years of age or older.  The average household size was 2.25 and the average family size was 2.96.

In the city, the population was spread out, with 24.9% under the age of 18, 9.0% from 18 to 24, 27.7% from 25 to 44, 20.2% from 45 to 64, and 18.1% who were 65 years of age or older.  The median age was 38 years. For every 100 females, there were 89.3 males.  For every 100 females age 18 and over, there were 84.2 males.

The median income for a household in the city was $34,761, and the median income for a family was $45,902. Males had a median income of $31,442 versus $21,543 for females. The per capita income for the city was $19,132.  About 6.5% of families and 9.6% of the population were below the poverty line, including 12.9% of those under age 18 and 7.9% of those age 65 or over.

History 
Effingham was first settled in 1814, and was known from then until 1859 as Broughton. In 1859, it became the county seat with buildings relocated from nearby (now deserted) Ewington. The community was named after General E. Effingham, a local surveyor.

In the late 1880s, local citizens founded Austin College, which lasted for several decades, and ultimately was purchased to become the Illinois College of Photography, also known as Bissel College.  That school closed due to the Great Depression in the 1930s.

On April 4, 1949, St. Anthony's Hospital caught fire and burned to the ground, killing 74 people.  As a result, fire codes nationwide were improved.  Due to extensive media coverage, including a Life magazine cover story, donations for rebuilding the hospital came from all 48 states and several foreign countries.

Effingham was a sundown town; daytime segregation was enforced until at least the mid-1960s.

Rail transportation 

Effingham is historically important as a rail junction.  The old Pennsylvania Railroad and the former Illinois Central Railroad crossed in downtown Effingham.  Even today, Amtrak's City of New Orleans passes through daily.

Amtrak, the national passenger rail system, provides service to Effingham under the daily City of New Orleans route to New Orleans and Chicago, Saluki, and Illini routes to Chicago and Carbondale. Until October 1, 1979, the station also served Amtrak's former National Limited line between Kansas City and New York City. As of today the foamer Illinois Central line is now taken over by CN Canadian National and the foamer PRR was taken over by Conrail then the SCL and now CSX Transportation. And in 2021 Effingham IL made a Quiet Zone or No Train Horn Zone on CN but CSX still blows the horns. Originally Amtrak used to pass on the foamer SCL line but Amtrak Trains no longer run on CSX but mostly on Canadian National.

Education 
Effingham has several schools, both public and private. The private schools are both religiously affiliated and include Saint Anthony and Sacred Heart. Saint Anthony Grade School (SAGS) serves grades preschool (age 3+) to eighth grade. SAGS has the Bullpup as its mascot. Sacred Heart Grade School (SHS) serves preschool (age 3+) to eighth grade. SHS's mascot is the Shamrock. The public schools include the Early Learning Center, South Side Elementary, Central Grade School, Effingham Junior High School (EJHS), and Effingham High School. The Early Learning Center serves preschool and kindergarten age children. South Side Elementary serves first and second graders. Aspire is a school for students who are likely to drop out or those who get expelled. Central Grade School serves third through fifth grade students. Central Grade school's mascot is the Mustang. EJHS serves junior high students in grades six to eight. EJHS's mascot is the Mustang.

Effingham High School (EHS) is the public high school. The new EHS opened in the fall of 1998, and has a current enrollment of 849. The former EHS building, built in 1939 as a WPA project and expanded in 1965, is currently the junior high, serving grades 6–8. The old junior high, Central School, is now a grade school serving grades 3–5.  EHS athletics were originally known as the Warriors but the name was changed after Ada Kepley, a city resident, referred to Effingham as the "Heart of America" in a campaign to attract visitors to the city. The name stuck, with references in the city government and the downtown movie theater named the Heart Theater. EHS athletics are now known as the Flaming Hearts.

Effingham is also home to St. Anthony High School, a private Roman Catholic High School. SAHS athletics are known as the Bulldogs.

SHS athletics and extra-curricular activities currently consist of boys' baseball, girls' softball, girls' basketball (grades 4–8), boys' basketball (grades 4–8), girls' track (grades 5-8), boys' track (grades 5–8), girls' cross country (grade 5–8), boys' cross country (grades 5–8), volleyball, cheerleading, band (grades 5–8), chorus (grades 5–8), musicals, plays, student council, and scholar bowl.

SAGS athletics and extra-curricular activities currently consist of boys' baseball, girls' softball, girls' track, boys' track, girls' cross country, boys' cross country, volleyball (grades 7-8), girls' basketball (grades 6-8), boys' basketball (grades 6-8), cheerleading, student council, scholastic bowl, spring musical, art club, eco-meet, and bridge club.

SAHS athletics and extra-curricular activities currently consist of soccer, boys' golf, girls' golf, girls' volleyball, girls' tennis, girls' and boys' cross country, boys' fall baseball, boys' basketball, girls' basketball, cheerleading, wrestling, bellettes (dance), swimming, boys' tennis, spring baseball, girls' track, boys' track, softball, bass fishing, National Honor Society, WYSE (world youth in science and engineering), Society for Academic Achievement (SAA), scholar bowl, Spanish club, band, chorus, fall musical, spring play, drama club, book club, chemistry club, Spanish scholar bowl, and pep club.

EJHS athletics and extra-curricular activities currently consist of baseball, soccer, cross country, tennis, golf, cheerleading, football,
volleyball, basketball, swimming, chorus, band, theatre, and scholar bowl.

EHS athletics and extra-curricular activities currently consist of boys' baseball, coed soccer, cross country, girls' and boys' tennis, boys'
and girls' golf, coed wrestling, basketball cheerleading, girls' track, boys' track, football cheerleading, competition cheerleading, football, girls' softball, volleyball, girls' and boys' basketball, girls' and boys' swimming, chorus, band, marching band, theatre, student council, dance, WYSE, National Honor Society, Society for Academic Achievement (SAA), color guard, FACS club, math club, Young Heart Writers club, chemistry club, Spanish club, French club, book club, pep club, and scholar bowl.

Monument 

A  steel cross erected by the Cross Foundation is located in Effingham. The cross is made out of over 180 tons of steel and cost over $1 million. While the  Great Cross in St. Augustine, Florida, is believed to be the tallest freestanding cross in the western hemisphere, it is thinner than the cross in Effingham and has a narrower span.

Notable people 

 George J. Bauer, Illinois state representative
 Jack Berch, singer and radio personality; raised in Effingham
 Uwe Blab, center for the Dallas Mavericks, Golden State Warriors, and San Antonio Spurs; attended high school in Effingham
 Charles H. Constable, judge and Illinois state senator; died in Effingham
 Nick Gardewine, pitcher for the Texas Rangers; graduate of Effingham High School
 Chad Green, pitcher for the New York Yankees; graduate of Effingham High School
 Ada Kepley, first American woman to graduate from law school
 Jimmy Kite, driver with IndyCar and NASCAR
 Miles E. Mills, Illinois politician
 Mary Ann Brown Newcomb, Civil War nurse
 Brian Shouse, left-handed pitcher for the Tampa Bay Rays and Milwaukee Brewers in Major League Baseball
 Daniel Winkler, pitcher for the Chicago Cubs; born and raised in Effingham, attended St. Anthony High School
 Benson Wood, U.S. Congressman, 1895–1897

In popular culture 

Comedians and authors have poked fun at the "Effing" portion of the name Effingham and its use in North American and UK slang as a minced oath for the "F" word. For example, radio comedians Bob and Tom produced a segment on their national radio show referencing Effingham. Ben Folds's album Way to Normal uses a similar play on words in a track that was inspired by driving past Effingham, although the song refers to the city as "Effington".

References

External links 
 
 Effingham convention and visitor's bureau

Populated places established in 1814
Cities in Illinois
Cities in Effingham County, Illinois
Micropolitan areas of Illinois
National Road
County seats in Illinois
Monumental crosses in the United States
Sundown towns in Illinois